Immunoglobulin therapy is the use of a mixture of antibodies (normal human immunoglobulin or NHIG) to treat several health conditions. These conditions include primary immunodeficiency, immune thrombocytopenic purpura, chronic inflammatory demyelinating polyneuropathy, Kawasaki disease, certain cases of HIV/AIDS and measles, Guillain-Barré syndrome, and certain other infections when a more specific immunoglobulin is not available. Depending on the formulation it can be given by injection into muscle, a vein, or under the skin. The effects last a few weeks.

Common side effects include pain at the site of injection, muscle pain, and allergic reactions. Other severe side effects include kidney problems, anaphylaxis, blood clots, and red blood cell breakdown. Use is not recommended in people with some types of IgA deficiency. Use appears to be relatively safe during pregnancy. Human immunoglobulin is made from human blood plasma. It contains antibodies against many viruses.

Human immunoglobulin therapy first occurred in the 1930s and a formulation for injection into a vein was approved for medical use in the United States in 1981. It is on the World Health Organization's List of Essential Medicines. Each formulation of product is somewhat different. A number of specific immunoglobulin formulations are also available including for hepatitis B, rabies, tetanus, varicella infection, and Rh positive blood exposure.

Medical uses 
Immunoglobulin therapy is used in a variety of conditions, many of which involve decreased or abolished antibody production capabilities, which range from a complete absence of multiple types of antibodies, to IgG subclass deficiencies (usually involving IgG2 or IgG3), to other disorders in which antibodies are within a normal quantitative range, but lacking in quality – unable to respond to antigens as they normally should – resulting in an increased rate or increased severity of infections. In these situations, immunoglobulin infusions confer passive resistance to infection on their recipients by increasing the quantity/quality of IgG they possess. Immunoglobulin therapy is also used for a number of other conditions, including in many autoimmune disorders such as dermatomyositis in an attempt to decrease the severity of symptoms. Immunoglobulin therapy is also used in some treatment protocols for secondary immunodeficiencies  such as human immunodeficiency virus (HIV), some autoimmune disorders (such as immune thrombocytopenia and Kawasaki disease), some neurological diseases (multifocal motor neuropathy, stiff person syndrome, multiple sclerosis and myasthenia gravis) some acute infections and some complications of organ transplantation.

Immunoglobulin therapy is especially useful in some acute infection cases such as pediatric HIV infection and is also considered the standard of treatment for some autoimmune disorders such as Guillain–Barré syndrome. The high demand which coupled with the difficulty of producing immunoglobulin in large quantities has resulted in increasing global shortages, usage limitations and rationing of immunoglobulin.

United Kingdom 
The United Kingdom's National Health Service recommends the routine use of immunoglobulin for a variety of conditions including primary immunodeficiencies and a number of other conditions, but recommends against the use of immunoglobulin in sepsis (unless a specific toxin has been identified), multiple sclerosis, neonatal sepsis, and pediatric HIV/AIDS.

United States 
The American Academy of Allergy, Asthma, and Immunology supports the use of immunoglobulin for primary immunodeficiencies, while noting that such usage actually accounts for a minority of usage and acknowledging that immunoglobulin supplementation can be appropriately used for a number of other conditions, including neonatal sepsis (citing a sixfold decrease in mortality), considered in cases of HIV (including pediatric HIV), considered as a second line treatment in relapsing-remitting multiple sclerosis, but recommending against its use in such conditions as chronic fatigue syndrome, PANDAS (pediatric autoimmune neuropsychiatric disorders associated with streptococcal infection) until further evidence to support its use is found (though noting that it may be useful in PANDAS patients with an autoimmune component), cystic fibrosis, and a number of other conditions.

Brands include
 Asceniv (immune globulin intravenous, human – slra)
 Bivigam (immune globulin intravenous – human 10% liquid)
 Gamunex-C, (immune globulin injection human)
 Hizentra (immune globulin subcutaneous human)
 Hyqvia (immune globulin 10 percent – human with recombinant human hyaluronidase)
 Octagam (immune globulin intravenous, human)
 Panzyga (immune globulin intravenous, human – ifas)
 Xembify (immune globulin subcutaneous, human – klhw)

Canada 
The National Advisory Committee on Blood and Blood Products of Canada (NAC) and Canadian Blood Services have also developed their own separate set of guidelines for the appropriate use of immunoglobulin therapy, which strongly support the use of immunoglobulin therapy in primary immunodeficiencies and some complications of HIV, while remaining silent on the issues of sepsis, multiple sclerosis, and chronic fatigue syndrome.

Australia
The Australian Red Cross Blood Service developed their own guidelines for the appropriate use of immunoglobulin therapy in 1997. Immunoglobulin is funded under the National Blood Supply and indications are classified as either an established or emerging therapeutic role or conditions for which immunoglobulin use is in exceptional circumstances only.

Subcutaneous immunoglobulin access programs have been developed to facilitate hospital based programs.

Human normal immunoglobulin (human immunoglobulin G) (Cutaquig) was approved for medical use in Australia in May 2021.

European Union 
Brands include HyQvia (human normal immunoglobulin), Privigen (human normal immunoglobulin (IVIg)), Hizentra (human normal immunoglobulin (SCIg)), Kiovig (human normal immunoglobulin), and Flebogamma DIF (human normal immunoglobulin).

In the EU human normal immunoglobulin (SCIg) (Hizentra) is used in people whose blood does not contain enough antibodies (proteins that help the body to fight infections and other diseases), also known as immunoglobulins. It is used to treat the following conditions:
 primary immunodeficiency syndromes (PID, when people are born with an inability to produce enough antibodies);
 low levels of antibodies in the blood in people with chronic lymphocytic leukaemia (a cancer of a type of white blood cell) or myeloma (a cancer of another type of white blood cell) and who have frequent infections;
 low levels of antibodies in the blood in people before or after allogeneic haematopoietic stem cell transplantation (a procedure where the patient's bone marrow is cleared of cells and replaced by stem cells from a donor);
 chronic inflammatory demyelinating polyneuropathy (CIDP). In this rare disease, the immune system (the body's defence system) works abnormally and destroys the protective covering over the nerves.

It is indicated for replacement therapy in adults and children in primary immunodeficiency syndromes such as:
 congenital agammaglobulinaemia and hypogammaglobulinaemia (low levels of antibodies);
 common variable immunodeficiency;
 severe combined immunodeficiency;
 immunoglobulin-G-subclass deficiencies with recurrent infections;
 replacement therapy in myeloma or chronic lymphocytic leukaemia with severe secondary hypogammaglobulinaemia and recurrent infections.

Flebogamma DIF is indicated for the replacement therapy in adults, children and adolescents (0–18 years) in:
 primary immunodeficiency syndromes with impaired antibody production;
 hypogammaglobulinaemia (low levels of antibodies) and recurrent bacterial infections in patients with chronic lymphocytic leukaemia (a cancer of a type of white blood cell), in whom prophylactic antibiotics have failed;
 hypogammaglobulinaemia (low levels of antibodies) and recurrent bacterial infections in plateau-phase-multiple-myeloma (another cancer of a type of white blood cell) patients who failed to respond to pneumococcal immunisation;
 hypogammaglobulinaemia (low levels of antibodies) in patients after allogenic haematopoietic-stem-cell transplantation (HSCT) (when the patient receives stem cells from a matched donor to help restore the bone marrow);
 congenital acquired immune deficiency syndrome (AIDS) with recurrent bacterial infections.

and for the immunomodulation in adults, children and adolescents (0–18 years) in:
 primary immune thrombocytopenia (ITP), in patients at high risk of bleeding or prior to surgery to correct the platelet count;
 Guillain–Barré syndrome, which causes multiple inflammations of the nerves in the body;
 Kawasaki disease, which causes multiple inflammation of several organs in the body.

Side effects 
Although immunoglobulin is frequently used for long periods of time and is generally considered safe, immunoglobulin therapy can have severe adverse effects, both localized and systemic. Subcutaneous administration of immunoglobulin is associated with a lower risk of both systemic and localized risk when compared to intravenous administration (hyaluronidase-assisted subcutaneous administration is associated with a greater frequency of adverse effects than traditional subcutaneous administration but still a lower frequency of adverse effects when compared to intravenous administration). Patients who are receiving immunoglobulin and experience adverse events are sometimes recommended to take acetaminophen and diphenhydramine before their infusions to reduce the rate of adverse effects. Additional premedication may be required in some instances (especially when first getting accustomed to a new dosage), prednisone or another oral steroid.

Local side effects of immunoglobulin infusions most frequently include an injection site reaction (reddening of the skin around the injection site), itching, rash, and hives. Less serious systemic side effects to immunoglobulin infusions include an increased heart rate, hyper or hypotension, an increased body temperature, diarrhea, nausea, abdominal pain, vomiting, arthralgia or myalgia, dizziness, headache, fatigue, fever, and pain.

Serious side effects of immunoglobulin infusions include chest discomfort or pain, myocardial infarction, tachycardia, hyponatremia, hemolysis, hemolytic anemia, thrombosis, hepatitis, anaphylaxis, backache, aseptic meningitis, acute kidney injury, hypokalemic nephropathy, pulmonary embolism, and transfusion related acute lung injury. There is also a small chance that even given the precautions taken in preparing immunoglobulin preparations, an immunoglobulin infusion may pass a virus to its recipient. Some immunoglobulin solutions also contain isohemagglutinins, which in rare circumstances can cause hemolysis by the isohemagglutinins triggering phagocytosis.

In the case of less serious side effects, a patient's infusion rate can be adjusted downwards until the side effects become tolerable, while in the case of more serious side effects, emergency medical attention should be sought.

Immunoglobulin therapy also interferes with the ability of the body to produce a normal immune response to an attenuated live virus vaccine for up to a year, can result in falsely elevated blood glucose levels, and can interfere with many of the IgG-based assays often used to diagnose a patient with a particular infection.

Routes of administration

1950s – intramuscular
After immunoglobulin therapy's discovery and description in Pediatrics in 1952, weekly intramuscular injections of immunoglobulin (IMIg) were the norm until intravenous formulations (IVIg) began to be introduced in the 1980s. During the mid and late 1950s, one-time IMIg injections were a common public health response to outbreaks of polio before the widespread availability of vaccines. Intramuscular injections were extremely poorly tolerated due to their extreme pain and poor efficacy – rarely could intramuscular injections alone raise plasma immunoglobulin levels enough to make a clinically meaningful difference.

1980s – intravenous 
Intravenous formulations began to be approved in the 1980s, which represented a significant improvement over intramuscular injections, as they allowed for a sufficient amount of immunoglobulin to be injected to reach clinical efficacy, although they still had a fairly high rate of adverse effects (though the addition of stabilizing agents reduced this further).

1990s – subcutaneous 
The first description of a subcutaneous route of administration for immunoglobulin therapy dates back to 1980, but for many years subcutaneous administration was considered to be a secondary choice, only to be considered when peripheral venous access was no longer possible or tolerable.

During the late 1980s and early 1990s, it became obvious that for at least a subset of patients the systemic adverse events associated with intravenous therapy were still not easily tolerable, and more doctors began to experiment with subcutaneous immunoglobulin administration, culminating in an ad hoc clinical trial in Sweden of 3000 subcutaneous injections administered to 25 adults (most of whom had previously experienced systemic adverse effects with IMIg or IVIg), where no infusion in the ad hoc trial resulted in a severe systemic adverse reaction, and most subcutaneous injections were able to be administered in non-hospital settings, allowing for considerably more freedom for the people involved.

In the later 1990s, large-scale trials began in Europe to test the feasibility of subcutaneous immunoglobulin administration, although it was not until 2006 that the first subcutaneous-specific preparation of immunoglobulin was approved by a major regulatory agency (Vivaglobin, which was voluntarily discontinued in 2011). A number of other trade names of subcutaneous immunoglobulin have since been approved, although some small-scale studies have indicated that a particular cohort of patients with common variable immunodeficiency (CVID) may develop intolerable side effects with subcutaneous immunoglobulin (SCIg) that they do not with intravenous immunoglobulin (IVIg).

Although intravenous was the preferred route for immunoglobulin therapy for many years, in 2006, the US Food and Drug Administration (FDA) approved the first preparation of immunoglobulin that was designed exclusively for subcutaneous use.

Mechanism of action 
The precise mechanism by which immunoglobulin therapy suppresses harmful inflammation is likely multifactorial. For example, it has been reported that immunoglobulin therapy can block Fas-mediated cell death.

Perhaps a more popular theory is that the immunosuppressive effects of immunoglobulin therapy are mediated through IgG's Fc glycosylation. By binding to receptors on antigen presenting cells, IVIG can increase the expression of the inhibitory Fc receptor, FcgRIIB, and shorten the half-life of auto-reactive antibodies. The ability of immunoglobulin therapy to suppress pathogenic immune responses by this mechanism is dependent on the presence of a sialylated glycan at position CH2-84.4 of IgG. Specifically, de-sialylated preparations of immunoglobulin lose their therapeutic activity and the anti-inflammatory effects of IVIG can be recapitulated by administration of recombinant sialylated IgG1 Fc.

Sialylated-Fc-dependent mechanism was not reproduced in other experimental models suggesting that this mechanism is functional under a particular disease or experimental settings. On the other hand, several other mechanisms of action and the actual primary targets of immunoglobulin therapy have been reported. In particular, F(ab')2-dependent action of immunoglobulin to inhibit activation of human dendritic cells, induction of autophagy, induction of COX-2-dependent PGE-2 in human dendritic cells leading to expansion of regulatory T cells, inhibition of pathogenic Th17 responses, and induction of human basophil activation and IL-4 induction via anti-IgE autoantibodies. Some believe that immunoglobulin therapy may work via a multi-step model where the injected immunoglobulin first forms a type of immune complex in the patient. Once these immune complexes are formed, they can interact with Fc receptors on dendritic cells, which then mediate anti-inflammatory effects helping to reduce the severity of the autoimmune disease or inflammatory state.

Other proposed mechanisms include the possibility that donor antibodies may bind directly with the abnormal host antibodies, stimulating their removal; the possibility that IgG stimulates the host's complement system, leading to enhanced removal of all antibodies, including the harmful ones; and the ability of immunoglobulin to block the antibody receptors on immune cells (macrophages), leading to decreased damage by these cells, or regulation of macrophage phagocytosis. Indeed, it is becoming more clear that immunoglobulin can bind to a number of membrane receptors on T cells, B cells, and monocytes that are pertinent to autoreactivity and induction of tolerance to self.

A recent report stated that immunoglobulin application to activated T cells leads to their decreased ability to engage microglia. As a result of immunoglobulin treatment of T cells, the findings showed reduced levels of tumor necrosis factor-alpha and interleukin-10 in T cell-microglia co-culture. The results add to the understanding of how immunoglobulin may affect inflammation of the central nervous system in autoimmune inflammatory diseases.

Hyperimmune globulin
Hyperimmune globulins are a class of immunoglobulins prepared in a similar way as for normal human immunoglobulin, except that the donor has high titers of antibody against a specific organism or antigen in their plasma. Some agents against which hyperimmune globulins are available include hepatitis B, rabies, tetanus toxin, varicella-zoster, etc. Administration of hyperimmune globulin provides "passive" immunity to the patient against an agent. This is in contrast to vaccines that provide "active" immunity. However, vaccines take much longer to achieve that purpose while hyperimmune globulin provides instant "passive" short-lived immunity. Hyperimmune globulin may have serious side effects, thus usage is taken very seriously.

Hyperimmune serum is blood plasma containing high amounts of an antibody. It has been hypothesised that hyperimmune serum may be an effective therapy for persons infected with the Ebola virus.

Society and culture

Economics 
In the United Kingdom a dose cost the NHS between 11.20 and 1,200.00 pounds depending on the type and amount.

Brand names
As biologicals, various trade names of immunoglobulin products are not necessarily interchangeable, and care must be exercised when changing between them. Trade names of intravenous immunoglobulin formulations include Flebogamma, Gamunex, Privigen, Octagam and Gammagard, while trade names of subcutaneous formulations include Cutaquig, Cuvitru, HyQvia, Hizentra, Gamunex-C, and Gammaked.

Supply issues 

The United States is one of a handful of countries that allow plasma donors to be paid, meaning that the US supplies much of the plasma-derived medicinal products (including immunoglobulin) used across the world, including more than 50% of the European Union's supply. The Council of Europe has officially endorsed the idea of not paying for plasma donations for both ethical reasons and reasons of safety, but studies have found that relying on entirely voluntary plasma donation leads to shortages of immunoglobulin and forces member countries to import immunoglobulin from countries that do compensate donors.

In Australia, blood donation is voluntary and therefore to cope with increasing demand and to reduce the shortages of locally produced immunoglobulin, several programs have been undertaken including adopting plasma for first time blood donors, better processes for donation, plasma donor centres and encouraging current blood donors to consider plasma only donation.

Research
Experimental results from a small clinical trial in humans suggested protection against the progression of Alzheimer's disease, but no such benefit was found in a subsequent phase III clinical trial. In May 2020, the US approved a phase three clinical trial on the efficacy and safety of high-concentration intravenous immune globulin therapy in severe COVID-19.

References

External links 
 

Glycoproteins
Medical treatments
Therapeutic antibodies
Transfusion medicine
World Health Organization essential medicines
Wikipedia medicine articles ready to translate